During the 1997–98 English football season, Wimbledon F.C. competed in the FA Premier League (known as the FA Carling Premiership for sponsorship reasons). They finished 15th in the final table to secure a 13th successive top flight campaign, although their final position was disappointing given their performance earlier in the season.

Season summary
Despite the early season sale of Dean Holdsworth to Bolton Wanderers, Wimbledon showed the "Crazy Gang" spirit once more as they were still standing fourth at the beginning of December. Manager Joe Kinnear was hopeful that this could finally be the season when Wimbledon achieved a UEFA Cup place, but the team's form steadily deteriorated during the second half of the season. Their 15th-place finish was their worst since reaching the top flight in 1986, though they had never looked to be in any real danger of relegation.

Final league table

Results summary

Results by round

Results
Wimbledon's score comes first

Legend

FA Premier League

FA Cup

League Cup

Players

First-team squad
Squad at end of season

Left club during season

Reserve squad

Transfers

In

Out

Transfers in:  £6,300,000
Transfers out:  £7,800,000
Total spending:  £1,500,000

References

Notes

Wimbledon F.C. seasons
Wimbledon